Abbasabad-e Alaqeh Band (also Romanized as Abbāsābād-e ‘Alāqeh Band; also known as ‘Abbāsābād) is a village in Qaleh Now Rural District, Qaleh Now District, Ray County, Tehran Province, Iran. At the 2006 census, its population was 1,886, in 456 families.

References 

Populated places in Ray County, Iran